A Wedding Dream (German: Ein Hochzeitstraum) is a 1936 German comedy film directed by Erich Engel and starring Ida Wüst, Heinz Salfner and Inge List. It was shot at the Johannisthal Studios of Tobis Film in Berlin. The film's sets were designed by the art directors Karl Haacker and Hermann Warm.

Plot
Taking place just after the First World War in Poland close to the border with Russia where a widow runs a successful inn. She has made enough money and now wishes to settle down and marry a nobleman, which will consequently allow her daughter Vera to make a good social match. However things go wrong during a holiday on the French Riviera when her daughter falls in love with a chauffeur instead of the prince she had planned for her. To cap it all she discovers that the supposed nobleman she herself has married is in fact just a servant.

Cast
Ida Wüst as Frau Polenska 
Heinz Salfner as Fürst Narischkin 
Inge List as Vera Polenska 
Ferdinand Marian as Paul Puschkinow 
Theo Lingen as Prinz von Illyrien 
Hans Junkermann as François 
Hans Leibelt as Count Morotschin 
Julius Brandt as Monet 
Bruno Hübner as Iwan 
Werner Scharf as Michalek 
Erich Meißel as Officer
Georg A. Profé as Officer 
S. O. Schoening as border soldier
Carl Heinrich Worth as Grenzbeamter
Luise Hohorst
Heinrich Berg
Egon Brosig
Max Mothes
Ernst Rotmund
Richard Ludwig
Josef Karma
Kurt Klotz-Oberland
Kurt Mahncke
Ernst Rennspies

References

External links

1936 comedy films
German comedy films
Films of Nazi Germany
Films directed by Erich Engel
German black-and-white films
Films shot at Johannisthal Studios
Tobis Film films
Films set in 1919
Films set in Poland
Films set in France
German films based on plays
1930s German films
1930s German-language films